Ladislas Ntaganzwa (born 1962) is a Rwandan war criminal who was involved in the 1994 Rwandan genocide. According to his indictment,  Ntaganzwa, as mayor of Nyakizu, a commune of Butare, was instrumental in rallying Hutu Power fervor leading up to the genocide, and as the genocide began, distributed weapons, and directed and participated in killings.

On April 18, 1994, after a visit by interim President Sindikubwabo, during which he had called for the assassination of more Tutsis, Ntaganzwa allegedly ordered and led a massacre of Tutsis who had survived the first attack.

Ntaganzwa was arrested on December 7, 2015 in the Democratic Republic of Congo. His trial for nine counts of genocide was scheduled for March 20, 2016.

On May 28, 2020, Ntaganzwa was sentenced to life imprisonment.

References

Living people
1962 births
People indicted by the International Criminal Tribunal for Rwanda
Prisoners sentenced to life imprisonment by Rwanda
Mayors of places in Rwanda
People from Butare

Rwandan genocide perpetrators